Ingushetia, officially the Republic of Ingushetia, is a republic of Russia located in the North Caucasus of Eastern Europe. The republic is part of the North Caucasian Federal District, and shares land borders with the country of Georgia to its south; and borders the Russian republics of North Ossetia–Alania and Chechnya to its west and east, respectively; while having a border with Stavropol Krai to its north.

Its capital is the town of Magas, while the largest city is Nazran. At 3,600 square km, in terms of area, the republic is the smallest of Russia's non-city federal subjects. It was established on June 4, 1992, after the Checheno-Ingush Autonomous Soviet Socialist Republic was split in two. The republic is home to the indigenous Ingush, a people of Nakh ancestry. As of the 2021 Census, its population was estimated to be 509,541.

Largely due to the insurgency in the North Caucasus, Ingushetia remains one of the poorest and most unstable regions of Russia. Although the violence has died down in recent years, the insurgency in neighboring Chechnya has occasionally spilled into Ingushetia. According to Human Rights Watch in 2008, the republic has been destabilized by corruption, a number of high-profile crimes (including kidnapping and murder of civilians by government security forces), anti-government protests, attacks on soldiers and officers, Russian military excesses and a deteriorating human rights situation.

Etymology
The name Ingushetia is derived from the ancient village Angusht, which was renamed Tarskoye and transferred to North Ossetia in 1944 after the deportation of 23 February 1944,  "Operation Lentil".

The Ingush ethnic group

The Ingush, a nationality group indigenous to the Caucasus, mostly inhabit Ingushetia. According to the linguist Johanna Nichols, the Ingush speak the Ingush language, which is different from Chechen but is placed into the same language group due to the passive bilingualism of the Ingush people.

The Ingush are, to a great extent, traditionally a classless society based on a clan system and unwritten law. Approximately 350 clans live in Ingushetia today. Every clan, and each clan member, are viewed as equal. Unlike the neighboring nations in the Caucasus, the Ingush rarely had social superiors or inferiors.

The history of the Ingush is closely related to that of the Chechens. Byzantine and Georgian missionaries partially Christianised the Ingush, although Christianity was weakened by the Mongol invasions. The remains of several churches, notably the Tkhaba-Yerdy and the Albi-Yerd can be found in Ingushetia. The Ingush gradually converted to Islam throughout the 18th–19th century. Vakhushti of Kartli wrote in 1745 that the inhabitants of the village Angushti were Sunni Muslims.

Endonyms and exonyms

The Ingush refer to themselves as Ghalghaï (from Ingush: Ghala ('fortress' or 'town') and  ghaj ('inhabitants' or 'citizens'). 

The Ingush and Ingushetians were also known by the following ethnonyms or demonyms:

Exonyms: Gelia (American cartographer J.H. Colton, Strabo), Kist (Georgian), Gargar, Dzurdzuk (Georgian), Ghlighvi (Georgian), Angushtini (Russian), Mækhælon (Ossetian); Chechen highlanders called Ingush Makhloi (according to Chechen historian Khalid Oshayev).

Endonyms: These self-namings represent different Vainakh tribes which make up the Ingush population today. 

Ghalghaï or Galgai, Loamaro (meaning "mountaineer"), Nakh (meaning 'people'), Vainakh (meaning 'our people'), Orstkhoy, Galash, Tsori, Zhäyrkhoy, Khamkhoy, Metskhaloy or Fyappiy, and Nyasarkhoy.

Population origins
According to Leonti Mroveli, the 11th-century Georgian chronicler, the word Caucasian is derived from the Vainakh ancestor Kavkas.
According to Professor George Anchabadze of Ilia State University:  The Soviet-Russian anthropologists and scientists, N.Y. Marr, V.V. Bounak, R.M. Munchaev, I.M. Dyakonov, E.I. Krupnov, and G.A. Melikashvilli, wrote: "Among Ingush the Caucasian type is preserved better than among any other North Caucasian nation". Professor G.F. Debets recognized that Ingush Caucasian anthropologic type is the most Caucasian among Caucasians. 

In an article in Science magazine, Bernice Wuethrich states that American linguist Dr. Johanna Nichols "has used language to connect modern people of the Caucasus region to the ancient farmers of the Fertile Crescent" and that her research suggests that "farmers of the region were proto-Nakh-Daghestanians". Nichols is quoted as stating that "The Nakh–Dagestanian languages are the closest thing we have to a direct continuation of the cultural and linguistic community that gave rise to Western civilization"

Population genetics
The Ingush have 89% of J2 Y-DNA which is the highest known frequency in the world and J2 is closely associated with the Fertile Crescent.
 
The mitochondrial DNA (mtDNA) of the Ingush differs from other Caucasian populations and the rest of the world. "The Caucasus populations exhibit, on average, less variability than other [World] populations for the eight Alu insertion polymorphisms analyzed here. The average heterozygosity is less than that of any other region of the world, with the exception of Sahul. Within the Caucasus, the Ingush have much lower levels of variability than any of the other populations. The Ingush also showed unusual patterns of mtDNA variation when compared with other Caucasus populations (Nasidze and Stoneking, submitted), which indicates that some feature of the Ingush population history, or of this particular sample of the Ingush, must be responsible for their different patterns of genetic variation at both mtDNA and the Alu insertion loci."

History

Prehistory

10,000–8000 BC According to Bernice Wuethrich's article "Peering Into the Past, With Words", Johanna Nichols showed that linguistic evidence indicates the ancestors of Nakh people migrated to the slopes of the Caucasus from the Fertile Crescent where farming and raising sheep and cattle had been discovered. Nichols stated: "The Nakh–Dagestanian languages are the closest thing we have to a direct continuation of the cultural and linguistic community that gave rise to Western civilisation." Anthropologist Henry Harpending of the University of Utah is impressed by her research.

6000–4000 BC Neolithic era. Pottery is known to the region. Old settlements near Ali-Yurt and Magas, discovered in the modern times, revealed tools made out of stone: stone axes, polished stones, stone knives, stones with holes drilled in them, clay dishes etc. Settlements made out of clay bricks discovered in the plains. In the mountains, there were discovered settlements made out of stone surrounded by walls some of them dated back to 8000 BC.

4000–3000 BC Invention of the wheel (3000 BC), horseback riding, metal works (copper, gold, silver, iron) dishes, armor, daggers, knives, arrow tips. The artifacts were found near Nasare-Cort, Muzhichi, Ja-E-Bortz (also known as Surkha-khi), Abbey-Gove (also known as Nazran or Nasare).

20 BC Strabo first mentions Geli, or Galgay in his reference to a nation in the center of the Caucasus. O.W. Wahl in 1875 in his book "The Land of the Czar" page 239 mentioned "These two opinions mentioned by Strabo come after all to the same point ; for the Legi are the modern Lesghi, and the Geli the Ingush tribe Galgai, and the Keraunian Mountains are the northern ranges of the Caucasus as far as the Beshtaú." The same statement about Gelia being Ingush was made by a German professor Karl Koch in 1843 in his book "Reise durch Russland nach dem kaukasischen Isthmus" page 489. Jacobus Van Wijk Roelandszoon, Jacobus van Wijk (Roelandszoon) in 1821 book "Algemeen aardrijkskundig woordenboek volgens de nieuwste staatkundige veranderingen, en de laatste, beste en zekerste berigten" page 1050 also mention that Gelli or Gelad are the Ingush people which is mentioned by Zonaras.

900 AD – 1200 AD the kingdom in the center of the Caucasus splits into Alania and Noble Alania (known from Russian as Царственные Аланы). German scientist Peter Simon Pallas  believed that Ingush people (Kist) were the direct descendants from Alania.

1239 AD Destruction of the Alania capital of Maghas (both names known solely from Muslim Arabs) and Alan confederacy of the Northern Caucasian highlanders, nations, and tribes by Batu Khan (a Mongol leader and a grandson of Genghis Khan) "Magas was destroyed in the beginning of 1239 by the hordes of Batu Khan. Historically Magas was located at approximately the same place on which the new capital of Ingushetia is now built" – D.V.Zayats

1300 AD – 1400 AD War between the Alans, Tamerlan, Tokhtamysh, and the Battle of the Terek River. The Alan tribes build fortresses, castles, and defense walls locking the mountains from the invaders. Part of the lowland tribes occupied by Mongols. The insurgency against Mongols begins. "One map of the area during the Mongol period gives us a clue why there was not much written about the Vainakh— as the area of Chechnya-Ingushetia on that map is simply marked as "ungovernable". This is not surprising, as the majority of armies moving north or south would be interested in passing through the mountains and getting to their ultimate destinations as quickly as possible— leaving the peoples between the two passes relatively unmolested."  – Schaefer, Robert W. "Insurgency in Chechnya and the North Caucasus: From Gazavat to Jihad" p. 51. In 1991 the Jordanian historian Abdul-Ghani Khassan presented the photocopy from old Arabic scripts claiming that Alania was in Chechnya and Ingushetia, and the document from Alanian historian Azdin Vazzar (1395–1460) who claimed to be from Nokhcho tribe of Alania.

1558 AD Russian conquest of the Caucasus. 1558 Temryuk of Kabarda sends his emissaries to Moscow requesting help against Ingush tribes from Ivan the Terrible. Ivan the Terrible marries Temryuk's daughter Maria Temryukovna the Circassian (Kabardin) tsaritsa. Alliance formed to gain the ground in the central Caucasus for the expanding Tsardom of Russia against stubborn Vainakh defenders.

1562 AD Joint Russian, Kabardian, and Nogay forces attack Ingush. According to Russian sources 164 Ingush settlements were completely destroyed in this war. Lowland Ingushetia occupied by Russia and their Kabardian allies.

In Caucasian War and as part of Terek Cossacks Okrug 
 
In the 18th century the Ingush were mostly pagan and Christian, with a Muslim minority. Beginning in 1588 some Chechen societies joined Russia. 
Russian historians claim that the Ingush volunteered to become a part of Russia. This assertion is mostly based on the document signed on 13 June 1810 by General-Major Delpotso and representatives of two Ingush clans, but most other clans resisted the Russian conquest. In 1811, at the Tsar's request, Moritz von Engelhardt, a Russian envoy of German origin visited the mountainous region of Ingushetia and tried to induce the Ingush people to join Russia, promising many benefits offered by the Tsar. The representative of the Ingush people rejected the proposal with the reply: "Above my hat I see only sky". This encounter later was later used by Goethe in his "Freisinn"

On June 29, 1832, the Russian Baron Rozen reported in letter No.42 to count Chernishev that "on the 23rd of this month I exterminated eight Ghalghaj (Ingush) villages. On the 24th I exterminated nine more villages near Targim." By November 12, 1836 (letter no.560, he claimed that highlanders of Dzheirkah, Kist, and Ghalghaj had been at least temporarily subdued. In 1829 Imam Shamil began a rebellion against Russia. He conquered Dagestan, Chechnya, and then attacked Ingushetia hoping to convert the Ingush people into Islam, thus gaining strategic ally. But the Ingush defeated Imam Shamil's forces. They successfully repulsed two more attempts in 1858. Nevertheless, locked in warfare with two strong opponents and their allies, Ingush forces were eventually devastated. According to the Russian officer Fedor Tornau, who fought with the aid of Ossetian allies against the Ingush, the Ingush had no more six hundred warriors. However, the Russian conquest in Ingushetia was extremely difficult and the Russian forces began to rely more upon methods of colonization: extermination of the local population and resettlement of the area with Cossack and Ossetian loyalists.

The colonization of Ingush land by Russians and Ossetians began in the middle of the 19th century. The Russian General Evdokimov and Ossetian colonel Kundukhov in 'Opis no. 436' "gladly reported" that "the result of colonization of Ingush land was successful":
Ingush village Ghazhien-Yurt was renamed to Stanitsa Assinovskaya in 1847.
Ingush village Ebarg-Yurt was renamed to Stanitsa Troitskaya in 1847.
Ingush town Dibir-Ghala was renamed to Stanitsa Sleptsovskaya in 1847.
Ingush village Magomet-Khite was renamed to Stanitsa Voznesenskaya in 1847.
Ingush village Akhi-Yurt was renamed to Stanitsa Sunzhenskaya in 1859.
Ingush village Ongusht was renamed to Stanitsa Tarskaya in 1859.
Ingush town Ildir-Ghala was renamed to Stanitsa Karabulakskaya in 1859.
Ingush village Alkhaste was renamed to Stanitsa Feldmarshalskaya in 1860.
Ingush village Tauzen-Yurt was renamed to Stanitsa Vorontsov-Dashkov in 1861.
Ingush village Sholkhi was renamed to Khutor Tarski in 1867.
After Imam Shamil's repeated losses of at the end of the Caucasian War, the Russians and Chechens unified their forces. Former Chechen rebels and their men joined the Russian ranks. 3 November 1858 General Evdokimov ordered (order N1896) a former rebel commander naib Saib-Dulla Gekhinski (Saadulla Ospanov) of Chechnya to attack and destroy Ingush settlements near the Assa and Fortanga rivers: Dattikh, Meredzhi, Aseri, Shagot-Koch and others. After their defeats in combat, the remaining Ingush clans resorted mostly to underground resistance. 

The Russians built the fortress Vladikavkaz ("ruler of the Caucasus") on the place of Ingush village of Zaur. Russian General Aleksey Petrovich Yermolov wrote in a letter to the Tsar of Russia, "It would be a grave mistake for Russia to alienate such a militaristic nation as the Ingush." He suggested the separation of the Ingush and Chechens in order for Russia to win the war in the Caucasus. In another letter from General Ermolov to Lanski (dated 12 January 1827) on the impossibility of forceful Christianization of the Ingush, Yermolov wrote: "This nation, the most courageous and militaristic among all the highlanders, cannot be allowed to be alienated..."

The last organized rebellion (the so-called "Nazran insurrection") in Ingushetia occurred in 1858 when 5,000 Ingush launched an attack against Russian forces, but lost to the latter's superior number. The rebellion signaled the end of the First Russo-Caucasian War. In the same year, the Tsar encouraged the emigration of Ingush and Chechens to Turkey and the Middle East by claiming that "Muslims need to live under Muslim rulers". His desire was to depopulate the area for the settlement of Ossetians and Cossacks. Some Ingush became exiled to deserted territories in the Middle East where many of them died. The remainder were Russified. It was estimated that 80% of the Ingush had left Ingushetia for the Middle East by 1865.

After the Russian Revolution of 1917, the Soviets promised the Ingush that the villages and towns annexed during the colonization would be returned to the Ingush. Ingushetia becomame a major battleground between the old archenemies: general Denikin, and Ingush resistance fighters. In his memoirs, general Denikin wrote

As part of the Mountainous Republic of the Northern Caucasus
On December 21, 1917 Ingushetia, Chechnya, and Dagestan declared independence from Russia and formed a single state called the "United Mountain Dwellers of the North Caucasus" (also known as Mountainous Republic of the Northern Caucasus), which was recognized by Central Powers (Germany, Austro-Hungary and Turkey), Georgia, and Azerbaijan (which declared their independence from Russia in 1918) as an independent state. For example, Anna Zelkina writes that in May 1918 the first country to recognize independence was Turkey:

Later Germany and others followed the recognition. According to P. Kosok:

According to British War Office, Germans tried to establish the military base in Ingushetia. 

The capital of the new state was moved to Temir-Khan-Shura (Dagestan). The first prime minister of the state was elected Tapa Chermoyev, a Chechen prominent statesman; the second prime minister was Ingush statesman Vassan-Girey Dzhabagiev who also was the author of the Constitution of the land in 1917. In 1920 he was reelected for a third term. In 1921 Russians attacked and occupied the country and forcefully merged it with the Soviet state. The Caucasian war for independence continued and the government went into exile.

As part of Chechen-Ingush ASSR
Cossack General Andrei Shkuro in his book writes:

The Soviets confiscated the remaining Ingush properties by collectivization and dekulakization and unified Chechnya and Ingushetia into Chechen-Ingush ASSR. 

During World War II Ingush youth were drafted into the Russian army. In August 1942 Nazi German forces captured half of the North Caucasus within thirty-three days moving from Rostov-On-Don to Mozdok 560 km or almost 17 km per day (see Battle of the Caucasus). From Mozdok to Malgobek same thirty three days, 20 km the German forces moved roughly 600 meters per day and were stopped only at Ordzhonikidze (modern-day Vladikavkaz) and Malgobek which were mostly populated by Ingush before the genocide of 23 February 1944. The fighting for the Malgobek was so intense that the small town was captured and recaptured four times until the Germans finally retreated. 

According to the Soviet military newspaper Red Star, after receiving the news about German brutality toward civilians in Kabardino-Balkaria, Ingush people declare Jihad(Gazavat) against Germans. Stalin planned the expansion of the USSR in the south through Turkey. Muslim Chechens and Ingush could become a threat to the expansion. In February 1944 near the end of World War II, Russian Army and NKVD units flooded the Chechen-Ingush ASSR. The maneuvers were disguised as military exercises of the southern district.

Genocide of 1944

During World War II, in 1942 German forces entered the North Caucasus. For three weeks Germans captured over half of the North Caucasus. They were only stopped at two Chechen-Ingush cities: Malgobek and Ordzhonikidze (a.k.a. "Vladikavkaz") by heroic resistance of natives of Chechen-Ingush ASSR. Soviet propaganda portrayed Chechens and Ingush as "traitors". 

On 23 February 1944, Ingush and Chechens were falsely accused of collaborating with the Nazis, and the entire Ingush and Chechen populations were deported to Kazakhstan, Uzbekistan, and Siberia in Operation Lentil, on the orders of Soviet leader Joseph Stalin, while the majority of their men were fighting on the front. The initial phase of the deportation was carried out on American-supplied Studebaker trucks specifically modified with three submachine gun-nest compartments above the deported to prevent escapes. American historian Norman Naimark writes:  The deportees were gathered on the railroad stations and during the second phase transferred to the cattle railroad carts. Up to 30% of the population perished during the journey or in the first year of the exile. The Prague Watchdog claims that "in the early years of their exile about half of the Chechens and Ingush died from hunger, cold and disease". The deportation was classified by the European Parliament in 2004 as genocide. After the deportation Ingush resistance against Soviets rises again. Those who escaped the deportation, shepherds who were high in the mountains during the deportation combine forces and form rebel groups which constantly attack Russian forces in Ingushetia. Major rebel groups were led by Akhmed Khuchbarov, Tsitskiev brothers, and Ingush femalesniper Laisat Baisarova. The last one of the male Ingush rebels was killed in 1977 by the KGB officers, while Baisarova was never captured or killed. American professor Johanna Nichols, who specializes in Chechen and Ingush philology, provided the theory behind the deportation:

After return from Central Asia
After 13 years of exile, the Ingush were allowed to return to Chechen-Ingushetia (but not to Ordzhonikidze a.k.a. "Vladikavkaz" or the Prigorodny District). Most of Ingushetia's territory had been settled by Ossetians and part of the region had been transferred to North Ossetia. The returning Ingush faced considerable animosity from the Ossetians. The Ingush were forced to buy their homes back from the Ossetians and Russians. These hardships and injustices led to a peaceful Ingush protest in Grozny on 16 January 1973, which was crushed by the Soviet troops In 1989, the Ingush were officially rehabilitated along with other peoples that had been subjected to repressions.

Post-Soviet period
In 1991, when the Chechens declared independence from the Soviet Union to form the Chechen Republic of Ichkeria, the Ingush chose to secede from the Chechen-Ingush Republic. Thus, in 1992 the Ingush joined the newly created Russian Federation to try to resolve the conflict with Ossetia peacefully, also in the hope that the Russians would return their land as a token of their loyalty.

Ethnic cleansing of 1992
However, ethnic tensions in North Ossetia which were orchestrated by Ossetian nationalists (per Helsinki Human Right Watch), led to an outbreak of violence in the Ossetian–Ingush conflict in October–November 1992, when another ethnic cleansing of the Ingush population started. According to media reports, Ingush hostages were held in 1992 in Beslan high school gymnasium. The hostages were all kept in the same gymnasium, and deprived of food and water; at least one newborn, and several dozen male Ingush hostages were executed. 

In a possible retaliation in 2004, Chechen and Ingush militants took over 500 Osset hostages in Beslan high-school. (It was the same building where Ossetian militants had held hundreds of Ingush hostages in 1992). Over 60,000 Ingush civilians were forced from their homes in the Prigorodny District of North Ossetia. As a result of the conflict, pro-Russian general Ruslan Aushev, a decorated war hero from the War in Afghanistan, was appointed by the Russian government as the first president of Ingushetia to stop the spread of the conflict. Partial stability returned under his rule.

First and Second Chechen Wars

In 1994, when the First Chechen War started, the number of refugees in Ingushetia from both conflicts doubled. According to the UN, for every citizen of Ingushetia, one refugee arrived from Ossetia or Chechnya. This influx was very problematic for the economy, which collapsed after Aushev's success. The second Russo-Chechen war which started in 1999 brought more refugees (at some point there was one refugee for every Ingush citizen: 240,000 from Chechnya plus 60,000 from North Ossetia at the peak in 2000) and misery to Ingushetia. In 2001, Aushev was forced to leave his presidency and was succeeded by Murat Zyazikov, a former KGB general. The situation worsened under his rule. Many young Ingush men were abducted by Russian and Ossetian death squads. according to Human rights watchdogs Memorial and Mashr. The Ingush mountains are closed for Ingush nationals. 

The number of rebel attacks in Ingushetia rose, especially after the number of Russian security forces was tripled. For example, according to a Russian news agency a murder of an ethnic-Russian school teacher in Ingushetia was committed by two ethnic-Russian and ethnic-Ossetian soldiers; Issa Merzhoev the Ingush Police detective who solved the crime was shot at and killed by "unknown" assailants shortly after he had identified the murderer.
At least four people were injured when a vehicle exploded on 24 March 2008. An upsurge in violence in these months targeted local police officers and security forces. In January 2008, the Federal Security Service of the Russian Federation launched a "counter-terrorism" operation in Ingushetia after receiving information that insurgents had been preparing a series of attacks.

Early in August 2008, the war between Georgia and South Ossetia broke out, in which the Russian Federation subsequently became involved. After the outbreak of the war, there were virtually no more attacks or abductions of Ingush civilians by "unknown" forces. Most of the Russian forces were transferred to North and South Ossetia 31 August 2008 Magomed Yevloyev, the head of Ingush opposition and the owner of the website ingushetiya.ru, was killed by Russian security forces Shortly before the unrecognised opposition group People's Parliament of Ingushetia Mekhk-Kkhel called for the recognition of the Russian semi-autonomous republic's independence, opposition activist Magomed Khazbiyev proclaimed, "We must ask Europe or America to separate us from Russia."

On October 18, 2008, a Russian military convoy came under grenade attack and machine gun fire near Nazran. Official Russian reports of the ambush, which has been blamed on local Muslim separatists, said two soldiers were killed and at least seven injured. Reports from Ingush opposition sources suggested as many as forty to fifty Russian soldiers were killed.

On October 30, 2008, Zyazikov was dismissed from his office (he himself claimed he resigned voluntarily). On the next day, Yunus-Bek Yevkurov was nominated by Dmitry Medvedev and approved as President by the People's Assembly of Ingushetia (later the title President was renamed to Head). This move was endorsed by major Russian political parties and by the Ingush opposition. Under the current rule of Yevkurov, Ingushetia seems much calmer, showing some semblance of the Russian government. Attacks on policemen have fallen by 40% and abductions by 80%.

Military history
According to professor Johanna Nichols, in all the recorded history and reconstructable prehistory, the Ingush people have never undertaken battle except in defense. In the 3rd and 2nd centuries BC Pharnavaz, his son Saurmag the Iberian kings, and the relatives of Ingush people per Leonti Mroveli, received military assistance from Ingush people in defense of Iberia against the Kartli occupation.

During World War I, 500 cavalrymen from an Ingush regiment of the Wild Division attacked the German Iron Division. The Russian Emperor Nicholas II, assessing the performance of the Ingush and Chechen regiments during the Brusilov breakthrough on the Russian-German front in 1915 wrote in a telegram to the Governor-General of the Tersky region Fleisher:

In 1994–1996 Ingush volunteers fought alongside Chechens in the First Chechen War. Aside from a few incidents (including the killings of Ingush civilians by Russian soldiers), Ingushetia was largely kept out of the war by a determined policy of non-violence pursued by President Ruslan Aushev.

This changed after the beginning of the Second Chechen War, and especially since Murat Zyazikov became the second Russian appointed president of Ingushetia in 2002. The first major rebel attack of the conflict, in which a military convoy was destroyed occurred in May 2000 and caused the deaths of 19 soldiers. In the June 2004 Nazran raid, Chechen and Ingush rebels attacked government buildings and military bases across Ingushetia, resulting in the deaths of at least 90 Ingush people and an unknown number of Russian troops. Among them the Republic's acting interior minister Abukar Kostoyev, his deputy Zyaudin Kotiyev. In response to a sharp escalation in attacks by insurgents since the summer of 2007, Moscow sent in an additional 25,000 MVD and FSB troops, tripling the number of special forces in Ingushetia.

Resistance

1800s–1860s: Insurgency against Russian conquest.
1860s–1890s: Raids of Ingush abreks on the Georgian Military Highway and Mozdok.
1890s–1917: Insurgency of Ingush resistance under Chechen abrek Zelimkhan Gushmazukaev and Ingush abrek Sulom-beck Sagopshinski, execution of Russian viceroy to Ingushetia colonel Mitnik by Ingush resistance fighter Buzurtanov.
1917–1920s: Insurgency of Ingush resistance fighters against combined Russian White Guards, Cossacks, Ossetians, and general Denikin forces.
1920s–1930s: Insurgency of Ingush people against Communists, executions of Communist leader of Ingushetia Chernoglaz by Ingush rebel Uzhakhov. Execution of Communist party leader of Ingushetia Ivanov by Ingush rebels.
1944–1977: Ingush rebels avenging the deportation of the Ingush nation. Scores of Russian army units and NKVD, KGB officers killed.
1992: Ossetian-Ingush conflict. In combat operations Ingush rebels capture armor which later transferred to Chechens or given back to Russian army after the conflict ended.
1994: Nazran. Ingush civilians stop Russian army, flip armor, burn military trucks which were on the march to Chechnya in Russian-Chechen war. First Russian casualties reported from hands of Ingush rebels.
1994–1996: Ingush rebels defend Grozny and participate in combat operations on Chechen side.
1999–2006: Ingush rebels join Chechen rebels, the independence war turns into Jihad.
13 July 2001: Ingush people protest "defiling and desecration" of historical Christian Ingush church Tkhaba-Yerdy after Russian troops made the church into a public toilet. Though Ingush are Muslims they highly respect their Christian past.
15 September 2003: Ingush rebels use bomb truck and attack FSB headquarters in Maghas. Several dozens of Russian FSB officers killed including the senior officer overseeing the FSB in Chechen republic. The several story HQ building is severely damaged.
6 April 2004: Ingush rebels attack Russian appointed president of Ingushetia Murat Zyazikov. He was wounded when a car bomb was rammed into his motorcade.
22 June 2004: Chechen and Ingush rebels raid on Russian troops in Ingushetia. Hundreds of Russian troops killed.
10 July 2006: In the night, Chechen politician and leader of the terrorists Shamil Basayev and other four militants were killed in the village of the Ekazhevo during a truck explosion.
31 August 2008: Execution of Magomed Yevloyev Ingush dissident, journalist, lawyer, businessman, and the owner of the news website Ingushetiya.ru, known for being highly critical of Russian regime in Ingushetia. He was shot in the temple. Awarded posthumously, and his name is engraved in stone on the monuments at the Journalists' Memorials in Bayeux, France and Washington D.C., the United States.
30 September 2008: A suicide bomber attacked the motorcade of Ruslan Meiriyev, Ingushetia's top police official.
10 June 2009: Snipers killed Aza Gazgireyeva, deputy chief justice of the regional Supreme Court, as she dropped her children off at school. Russian news agencies also cited investigators as saying she was likely killed for her role in investigating the 2004 attack on Ingush police forces by Chechen fighters.
13 June 2009: Two gunmen sprayed former deputy prime minister Bashir Aushev with automatic-weapon fire as he got out of his car at the gate outside his home in the region's main city, Nazran.
22 June 2009: Russian appointed president of Ingushetia Yunus-Bek Yevkurov was badly hurt when a suicide bomber detonated a car packed with explosives as the president's convoy drove past. The attack killed three bodyguards.
12 August 2009: Gunmen killed construction minister Ruslan Amerkhanov in his office in the Ingush capital, Magas.
17 August 2009: A suicide bomber killed 21 Ingush police officers and unknown numbers of Russian Internal Ministry troops which were stationed in Nazran, after he drove a truck full of explosives into a MVD police base.
25 October 2009: Execution of Maksharip Aushev, an Ingush businessman, dissident, and a vocal critic of Russian regime policies in Ingushetia. His body had over 60 bullet holes. Awarded posthumously by the U.S. Department of State in 2009.
2 March 2010: Another terrorist has been killed in the village of the Ekazhevo, his name is Said Buryatsky, but his real one is Aleksandr Aleksandrovich Tikhomirov, although he was born in Republic of Buryatia.
5 April 2010: A suicide bomber injured three police officers in the town of Karabulak. Two officers died at the hospital as a result of their injuries.  While investigators arrived on scene, another car bomb was set off by remote.  Nobody was hurt in the second blast.
24 January 2011: A suicide bomber, Magomed Yevloyev (same first and last name as the slain Ingush opposition journalist Magomed Yevloyev), killed 37 people at Domodedovo airport, Moscow, Russia.
2012: Ingush rebels participate in war against Assad, Iranian, and Russian advisors in Syria which is largely viewed by the Ingush rebels as war against Russia and the Iranian-speaking Ossetians. The rebel Ingush commanders are veterans of Ossetian-Ingush conflict, wars in Chechnya, Daud Khalukhayev from Ingush village of Palanazh (Katsa), and a descendant of Ingush deportees of 1860's Syrian-born Ingush Walid Didigov.
6 June 2013: Accusation of Ingush rebel leader Ali "Maghas" Taziev in Rostov-On-Don regional Russian court, who was captured after he voluntarily given himself up in on 9 June 2010 to Russian forces in Ingushetia on the agreement that Russians will liberate his relatives held hostage on one of the Russian military bases.
27 August 2013: Execution of the head of security of Ingushetia Akhmet Kotiev and his bodyguard by Ingush rebels. Kotiev was actively involved in the assassination of Magomed Yevloyev.
10 December 2013: Ingush opposition leader Magomed Khazbiev, who was a close friend of assassinated Magomed Yevloyev, attends Euromaidan in Ukraine and participates in anti-Russian campaign there after which his parents were threatened and harassed in Russia. On his website he writes: "the fact that Putin's slaves harass my parents do not make any sense, if you [Russians] want me to stop you have to kill me like Magomed Yevloyev and Makhsharip Aushev".
2 February 2014: Russian FSB officially confirms that in the middle of December 2013 four North Caucasian instructors operate in Ukraine, and prepare Ukrainians for street battles against Russian interests.
20 April 2014: Famous Ingush human rights defender Ibrgim Lyanov stated that Ingushetia wants to separate from Russia and become an independent state using the example of the Crimean separation from Ukraine.
24 May 2014: Ingush rebel leader Arthur Getagazhev, 4 rebels, and 2 civilians were killed in action in the village of Sagopshi by Russian forces.
2 July 2014: After several months of denial, pro-Russian president of Ingushetia finally recognizes that Ingush rebels are fighting in Ukraine against pro-Russia forces.
2 July 2014: Ingush rebels attack Russian armored military convoy killing 1 and wounding 7 soldiers.
6 July 2014: Russian special forces prepared an ambush near the morgue in Nazran hospital where the body of Arthur Getagazhev was located. The intelligence reported that Ingush rebels will try to recover the body of the slain leader. The intelligence was correct. Radio Free Europe (section specializing in the Caucasus), reports that in the middle of the day 2 Ingush rebels attacked the ambush, according to unofficial source two rebels killed 7 and wounded 4 Russian FSB and spetsnaz officers in less than 40 seconds, after which the rebels left the scene unharmed. The source in Ingush police who wanted to stay anonymous said that exact number of killed are known only by the FSB but nobody would dare to declare if officially. According to pro-Kremlin LifeNews released video the attack lasted less than 19 seconds. 
17 January 2015: Maghas. Rise of anti-Western sentiments. Over 20,000 Ingush citizens protest against European terrorism toward Muslims.
28 February 2015: Russian opposition leader Nemtsov's death linked to Ingushetia by Russian police.
26 March 2019: Thousands of people in Ingushetia have protested against a controversial border deal with neighboring Chechnya, denouncing land swaps under the agreement and calling for Ingushetia head Yunus-Bek Yevkurov to step down.
25 June 2019: Yunus-Bek Yevkurov, has announced his resignation after almost 11 years in the position. De facto Ingushetia has no active leader. Civil protests continue, Ingush people boycotting the Russian appointed elections.

Politics
Up until the dissolution of the Soviet state, Ingushetia was part of the Chechen-Ingush ASSR of the Russian Soviet Socialist Republic. In the late 1920s – early 1930s the Soviet officials were eager to enforce the Chechen-Ingush merger as an "objective" and "natural" process. The Soviet linguist Nikolay Yakovlev, who was a supporter of the merger, suggested that an inclusive name of "Veinakh" ("our people") had to be used for both the Chechens and Ingush. According to his views, the rapid urbanization and rapprochement of the Chechens and Ingush within one and the same republic might encourage the formation of a common culture and language and the establishment of a unified "Veinakh" people.

During the late 80's, together with the separatist tendencies across the Soviet Union, the Second Congress of the Ingush People was held in Grozny on September 9–10, 1989. The gathering was directed at the top leadership of the Soviet Union, and included a request to "restore the Ingush people's autonomy within their historical borders, the Ingush Autonomous Soviet Socialist Republic with a capital in the right-bank part of the city of Ordzhonikidze". The Ingush Republic was to be organized out of six traditional Ingush districts (including the contested Prigorodny District). The rise of the Russian Federation gave the Ingushetians the independence they vowed for. During the 1990s, Ingushetia was ruled by its elected president Ruslan Aushev, a former Soviet general and hero of the war in Afghanistan.

The head of government and the highest executive post in Ingushetia is the Head.

Recent heads:
Ruslan Aushev: November 10, 1992 (Head of the Republic until March 7, 1993) – December 28, 2001
Akhmed Malsagov (interim):  December 28, 2001 – May 23, 2002
Murat Zyazikov: May 23, 2002 – October 30, 2008
Yunus-Bek Yevkurov: October 30, 2008 – June 26, 2019
Makhmud-Ali Kalimatov: June 26, 2019–present

Recent Chairmen of the Government:
Ruslan Tatiyev: March 24, 1993 – July 5, 1993
Tamerlan Didigov: July 5, 1993 – March 21, 1994
Mukharbek Didigov: March 21, 1994 – December 9, 1996
Belan Khamchiyev: December 10, 1996 – August 3, 1998
Magomed-Bashir Darsigov: August 3, 1998 – November 24, 1999
Akhmed Malsagov: November 24, 1999 – June 14, 2002
Viktor Aleksentsev: August 26, 2002 – June 3, 2003
Timur Mogushkov: June 3, 2003 – June 30, 2005
Ibragim Malsagov: June 30, 2005 – March 13, 2008
Kharun Dzeytov: March 14, 2008 – November 12, 2008
Rashid Gaysanov: November 13, 2008 – October 5, 2009
Aleksey Vorobyov: October 5, 2009 – March 10, 2010
Musa Chiliyev: March 21, 2011 – September 19, 2013
Abubakar Malsagov: September 19, 2013 – November 18, 2016
Ruslan Gagiyev: November 18, 2016 – September 9, 2018
Zyalimkhan Yevloyev: September 9, 2018 – September 8, 2019
Konstantin Surikov: September 9, 2019 – January 27, 2020
Vladimir Slastenin: March 26, 2020–present
The parliament of the Republic is the People's Assembly, composed of 34 deputies elected for a four-year term.  The People's Assembly is headed by the Chairman.  As of 2022, the Chairman of the People's Assembly is Vladimir Slastenin.

The Constitution of Ingushetia was adopted on February 27, 1994.

Ingushetia is a member of the Unrepresented Nations and Peoples Organization.

The capital was moved from Nazran to Magas in December 2002.

The most recent election was held in 2013.

Administrative divisions

Cities under republic's jurisdiction (as of 2016):

Districts:

Demographics

Population:

Vital statistics
Source: Russian Federal State Statistics Service 

Note: Total fertility rate 2009, 2010, 2011 source:

Life expectancy

Ingushetia has life expectancy noticeably higher than in any other federal subjects of the Russian Federation. In such way, Ingushetia is a Russian "blue zone". In the pre-pandemic 2019, life expectancy in Ingushetia was the same as in Switzerland, according to estimation of WHO, — 83.4 years.

Ethnic groups

According to the 2021 Russian census, ethnic Ingush make up 96.4% of the republic's population. The Ingush, a nationality group indigenous to the Caucasus, mostly inhabit Ingushetia. They refer to themselves as Ghalghaj (from Ingush: Ghala ('fortress' or 'town') and ghaj ('inhabitants' or 'citizens'). The Ingush speak the Ingush language, which has a very high degree of mutual intelligibility with neighboring Chechen.

Other groups include Chechens (2.5%), Russians (0.7%), and a host of smaller groups, each accounting for less than 0.5% of the total population.

Religion

Ingushetia is one of the most religious regions of Russia. The Ingush are predominantly Shafi'i Madhhab of Sunni Islam with strong influence of Sufism, which is often associated with one of two traditional Sufi orders: the Sufi tariqa Naqshbandi, represented in Ingushetia by the brotherhood of Deni Arsanov, and the tariqa Qadiriyyah, associated with Kunta-Haji Kishiev.

Education
Ingush State University, the first institute of higher education in the history of Ingushetia, was founded in 1994 in Ordzhonikidzevskaya.

Geography

Ingushetia is situated on the northern slopes of the Caucasus. The republic borders North Ossetia–Alania (SW/W/NW/N), the Chechnya (NE/E/SE), and the country of Georgia (Mtskheta-Mtianeti) (southwards). The highest point is the Gora Shan (4451 m).

A  stretch of the Caucasus Mountains runs through the territory of the republic.

Rivers

Major rivers include:
Terek River
Assa River
Sunzha River

Natural resources
Ingushetia is rich in marble, timber, dolomite, plaster, limestone, gravel, granite, clay, thermal medical water, rare metals, mineral water, oil (over 60 billion tons), and natural gas reserves.

Climate
Ingushetia's climate is mostly continental.

 Average January temperature: 
 Average July temperature: 
 Average annual precipitation: 
 Average annual temperature:

Economy
There are some natural resources in Ingushetia: mineral water in Achaluki, oil and natural gas in Malgobek, forests in Dzheirakh, metals in Galashki. The local government is considering the development of tourism; however, this is problematic due to the uneasy situation in the republic itself and the proximity of some conflict zones. However, Ingushetia continues to remain as one of Russia's poorest republics, largely due to the ongoing conflict, corruption and civil disorders. Unemployment is estimated to be around 53%, and growing poverty is a major issue.

Notable people
 Musa Evloev, Greco-Roman wrestler. He is a two-time world champion, Olympic champion, and two-time national champion
 Movsar Evloev, #10 Ranked UFC Featherweight
 Tamerlan Akhriev, inventor of a ceramic rotor engine.
 Idris Bazorkin, writer.
 Ruslan Aushev, infantry general, hero of USSR, first president of Ingushetia.
 Rakhim Chakkhiev, boxer.
 Ismail Esmurziev, engineer.
 Issa Kodzoev, writer.
 Issa Kostoyev, policeman who captured serial killer Andrei Chikatilo.
 Nazyr Mankiev, wrestler.
 Murad Ozdoev, WWII ace.
 Sulom-Beck Oskanov, Air Force general.
 Magomet Sagov, PhD, academician (Academy of Sciences of the USSR).
 Islam Timurziev, boxer.
 Sergej Garbariniev, boxer.
 Amurhan Yandiev, detective who captured serial killer Andrei Chikatilo.
 Djemaldin Yandiev, poet.
 Tamara Yandieva, actress, singer.

See also
 Music in Ingushetia
 War in Ingushetia

Notes

References

Sources

External links

News from Ingushetia
News and History of Ingushetia
Official website of Ingushetia 
Unofficial website of Ingushetia 
Ingush Music/Video/Literature website 
Magas, Ingush youth website 
Head of Ingushetia's website 
Ingushetia's Republic News Portal 
Ingushetia Videos 
National Project: People of Ingushetia 

 
Islam in Russia
Members of the Unrepresented Nations and Peoples Organization
Nakh peoples
North Caucasus
States and territories established in 1992
Regions of Europe with multiple official languages
North Caucasian Federal District